Lone Oak is a town in Meriwether County, Georgia, United States. The population was 114 at the 2020 census.

History
The Georgia General Assembly incorporated Lone Oak as a town in 1901. The town's name is descriptive of the original condition of the site.

Geography
Lone Oak is located in northwest Meriwether County at  (33.171862, −84.820113). Georgia State Route 54 passes through the town, leading northeast  to Luthersville and west  to Hogansville.

Demographics

As of the census of 2000, there were 104 people, 44 households, and 31 families residing in the town. The racial makeup of the town was 76.92% White, 13.46% African American, 0.96% Native American, 5.77% from other races, and 2.88% from two or more races. Hispanic or Latino of any race were 5.77% of the population.

There were 44 households, out of which 34.1% had children under the age of 18 living with them, 45.5% were married couples living together, 22.7% had a female householder with no husband present, and 29.5% were non-families. 29.5% of all households were made up of individuals, and 15.9% had someone living alone who was 65 years of age or older. The average household size was 2.36 and the average family size was 2.90.

In the town, the population was spread out, with 23.1% under the age of 18, 4.8% from 18 to 24, 31.7% from 25 to 44, 20.2% from 45 to 64, and 20.2% who were 65 years of age or older. The median age was 40 years. For every 100 females, there were 70.5 males. For every 100 females age 18 and over, there were 60.0 males.

The median income for a household in the town was $36,250, and the median income for a family was $39,167. Males had a median income of $24,500 versus $28,000 for females. The per capita income for the town was $15,602. None of the population and none of the families were below the poverty line.

Arts and culture
The town hosts the Lone Oak Arts & Crafts Festival each November.

References

Towns in Meriwether County, Georgia
Towns in Georgia (U.S. state)